New Clouds is the sixth studio album by Adam Forkner under the band name White Rainbow, released in 2009 under the record company Kranky.

Reception

Joe Colly of Pitchfork praised the album, comparing it to a "long-form jazz" or "modern-classical piece".

Track listing

Charts

References

2009 albums
Kranky albums
Adam Forkner albums